Patricia Anne "Patsey" Stephens (née Roberts) was a female United States badminton international.

Badminton career
Stephens won the mixed doubles in 1949 All England Badminton Championships with her husband Clinton Stephens.
Patsey also won the mixed doubles in the 1948 U.S. National Badminton Championships and women's doubles in the 1962  U.S. Open Championships.

References

American female badminton players